A franchise agreement is a legal, binding contract between a franchisor and franchisee. In the United States franchise agreements are enforced at the State level.

Prior to a franchisee signing a contract, the US Federal Trade Commission regulates information disclosures under the authority of The Franchise Rule.  The Franchise Rule requires a franchisee be supplied a Franchise Disclosure Document (FDD) (originally called Uniform Franchise Offering Circular (UFOC)) prior to signing a franchise agreement, a minimum of fourteen days before signing a franchise agreement.

Once the Federal ten-day waiting period has passed, the Franchise Agreement becomes a State level jurisdiction document.  Each state has unique laws regarding franchise agreements.

A franchise agreement contents can vary significantly in content depending upon the franchise system, the state jurisdiction of the franchisor, franchisee, and arbitrator.

It overall provides the investor with a product, a branded name and recognition, and a support system.

A typical franchise agreement contains
 Franchise Disclosure Document (FDD)
 Disclosures required by state laws
 Parties defined in the agreement
 Recitals, such as Ownership of System, and Objectives of Parties
 Definitions, such as
Agreement, Territory Area, Area Licensee, Authorized deductions, Gross Receipts, License Network, The System Manual, Trademarks, Start Date, Trade name, Termination, Transfer of license.
 Licensed Rights, such as
Territory, Rights Reserved, Term and Renewal, Minimum Performance Standard
 Franchisors Services, such as
Administration, Collections and Billing, Consultation, Marketing, Manual, Training and Vendor Negotiation
 Franchisee Payments, such as
Initial Franchise Fee, Training Fees, Marketing Fund, Royalties, Renewal fee, and Transfer fee
 Franchisee Obligations, such as
Use of Trademarks, Financial Information, Insurance, Financial and Legal responsibility
 Relationship of Parties, such as
Confidentiality, Indemnification, Non-Compete clauses
 Transfer of License, such as
Consent of franchisor, Termination of license, Termination by licensee
 Other provisions
 Governing law
 Amendments
 Waivers
 Arbitration
 Severability

See also
American Association of Franchisees and Dealers
Franchise consulting
Franchise Disclosure Document
Franchise fraud
Franchise termination
Franchising
List of franchises
The Franchise Rule
U.S. Securities and Exchange Commission

References
Terms and conditions of franchise agreement

External links

International Franchise Association
American Association of Franchisees and Dealers
Franchise Brokers Association
FTC Franchise FAQ Page

 
Contract law